In astronomy, the meridian is the great circle passing through the celestial poles, as well as the zenith and nadir of an observer's location. Meridians, celestial and geographical, are determined by the pencil of planes passing through the Earth's rotation axis. For a location not at a geographical pole, there is a unique meridian plane in this axial-pencil through that location. The intersection of this plane with Earth's surface is the geographical meridian, and the intersection of the plane with the celestial sphere is the celestial meridian for that location and time.

There are several ways to divide the meridian into semicircles. In the horizontal coordinate system, the observer's meridian is divided into halves terminated by the horizon's north and south points. The observer's upper meridian passes through the zenith while the lower meridian passes through the nadir. Another way, the meridian is divided into the local meridian, the semicircle that contains the observer's zenith and both celestial poles, and the opposite semicircle, which contains the nadir and both poles.

On any given (sidereal) day/night, a celestial object will appear to drift across, or transit, the observer's upper meridian as Earth rotates, since the meridian is fixed to the local horizon. At culmination, the object contacts the upper meridian and reaches its highest point in the sky. An object's right ascension and the local sidereal time can be used to determine the time of its culmination (see hour angle).

The term meridian comes from the Latin meridies, which means both "midday" and "south", as the celestial equator appears to tilt southward from the Northern Hemisphere.

See also
 Meridian (geography)
 Prime meridian (planets)
 Prime vertical, the vertical circle perpendicular to a meridian
 Longitude (planets)

References
Millar, William (2006). The Amateur Astronomer's Introduction to the Celestial Sphere. Cambridge University Press.

Astronomical coordinate systems